Maiboza, also called Iulia or Julia, was a town of ancient Lydia. The name Maiboza does not occur among ancient authors, but is inferred from epigraphic and other evidence.

Its site is located near Gölmarmara in Asiatic Turkey.

References

Populated places in ancient Lydia
Former populated places in Turkey
Roman towns and cities in Turkey
History of Manisa Province